The Luxembourg Internet eXchange (LU-CIX) is a facility for Internet Service Providers (ISPs) based in Luxembourg, allowing them to easily interconnect within Luxembourg and hence to improve connectivity and service for their customers. The LU-CIX is an association with a neutral and open philosophy.

More information at the other page

External links 
 Official LU-CIX information

Internet exchange points in Luxembourg
Telecommunications in Luxembourg